Brigitte Oertli (born 10 June 1962) is a former Swiss alpine skier.

Career
During her career she has achieved 31 results among the top 3 in the World Cup. In Alpine skiing at the 1988 Winter Olympics, Oertli won silver medals in Downhill and Alpine Combined.

World Cup results

References

External links
 
 

1962 births
Living people
Swiss female alpine skiers
Alpine skiers at the 1984 Winter Olympics
Alpine skiers at the 1988 Winter Olympics
Olympic alpine skiers of Switzerland
Olympic silver medalists for Switzerland
Olympic medalists in alpine skiing
FIS Alpine Ski World Cup champions
20th-century Swiss women